Paul Berliner may refer to:

 Paul Berliner (ethnomusicologist) (born 1946), professor at Duke University
 Paul Berliner (trader), trader who settled charges of market manipulation with the Securities and Exchange Commission